Abe Martin was an American newspaper gag-a-day comic strip, drawn by Kin Hubbard and published from 1904 until 1937 in The Indianapolis News and other newspapers.

Character

Abe Martin was an anti-hero character, making wisecracker jokes and uttering sayings which became popular over the country. He made his first appearance on December 17, 1904. Originally the character's locality wasn't specified, but in a strip from February 3, 1905, he announced: "I'm goin' ter move ter Brown County Tewmorrow", which he did. At the time the character's popularity was such that by 1910 over 200 newspapers carried the strip and special almanacs were made. Notable fans were George Ade, Will Rogers and James Whitcomb Riley.

Early version
The Indianapolis News published a cartoon by Hubbard on September 15, 1904, featuring another character named Abe Martin.

Other one-panel cartoons of the era 
 Ching Chow
 Hambone's Meditations

External links

Sources

American comic strips
Martin, Abe
Martin, Abe
Martin, Abe
Martin, Abe
Martin, Abe
Martin, Abe
1904 comics debuts
1937 comics endings
Brown County, Indiana
Gag-a-day comics
Public domain comics
Defunct American comics